The Premier of the Virgin Islands is the head of government for the British Virgin Islands. As a British Overseas Territory, the Premier is appointed by the Governor on behalf of the British monarch, currently King Charles III. Until 2007, the head of government was known as the Chief Minister of the Virgin Islands, but a constitutional change in 2007 renamed the position as Premier.

The current Premier is Natalio Wheatley. He is serving since 5 May 2022.

History of the office
Since the 1967 constitution was adopted, only seven different people (all men) have served as Premier or Chief Minister, and each of them except for Cyril Romney has served at least two full terms. Also, each of them has served as the Leader of the Opposition.

H. Lavity Stoutt won the most general elections of any leader (he won five), followed by Orlando Smith (three). Stoutt, Smith and Willard Wheatley are the only leaders to have served two consecutive full terms (Ralph T. O'Neal also served two consecutive terms, but the first of those was the remaining part of a term after Stoutt's death).

List

(Dates in italics indicate de facto continuation of office)

All previous Chief Ministers or Premiers have served at least two terms except for Cyril Romney and	Andrew Fahie.

See also
List of current heads of government in the United Kingdom and dependencies
Politics of the British Virgin Islands
Governor of the Virgin Islands

Notes

References

Further reading

Heads of government of the British Virgin Islands

British Virgin Islands
Government of the British Virgin Islands